The Playhouse is a theatre in Sleaford, Lincolnshire, England. It is a Grade II listed Georgian building dating from 1820. The building became a school in the 1850s, and after serving several other purposes reopened as a theatre in 2000.

History
The Grade II listed Playhouse started life as a theatre and was built for Joseph Close Smedley (1784-1863) manager of a number of theatres in Lincolnshire and the surrounding counties. His first visit to Sleaford was about 1814. He had trained as a lawyer. In May 1803 whilst they were members of Thomas Shaftoe Robertson's Lincoln company he had married the actress Melinda Bullen (1781-1870) in the actors' church of St.Peter Mancroft in Norwich. They had at least nine children, Melinda, Anna and Joseph joined them on stage or in the theatre. Some of the other towns on the circuit included at various times Alford, Bourne, Caistor, Folkingham, Grimsby, Holbeach, Holden, March (also built for him), Melton Mowbray, Mildenhall, Southwell and Upwell.  
At least one earlier theatre existed in Sleaford, before Smedley had even visited the town, Mr.J. Sims brought a company in November 1806 to open the theatre on 1 December with The Soldier's Daughter and The Wags of Windsor.

Mr Smedley announced the opening of the 1826 season at the New Theatre on Monday 26 March 1826 with the Comedy of Speed the Plough and My Spouse and I. Days of Playing, Monday, Wednesday & Friday.

The 1827 season opened for a fortnight on Monday 16 April with the comedy A Bold Stroke for a Husband and The Forty Thieves, Paul Pry and The Liar on Wednesday, and Romeo and Juliet with Return'd Killed on Friday.

The newspaper report for the April start of the 1828 season stated "It is nearly 14 years since Mr. Smedley first managed the theatre in this town".

The Stamford Mercury of  Friday 20 May 1836 carried an advert.

As well as plays, theatres were the venues for operas, concerts and other entertainments, in order to remain viable. An advert in the Stamford Mercury of Friday 24 May 1839, is an example of this:

 In June the theatre hosted the Sleaford Tee-Total Festival.

In January 1840, Joseph Smedley, comedian, was licensed to open the  theatre, Sleaford for a period not exceeding sixty nights.

A newspaper announced a short season and lighting by Gas:
 Later after his retirement Smedley became a printer and bookseller, and joined with others to lease the gasworks and his son George was a manager.

In 1841 after the theatre was sold, John Hyde, a silversmith, advertised it for let. By the end of the year it was announced in the press prior to an auction of paper hangings.  

In January 1842 the Mosley & Abbott company opened the theatre after playing at Gainsborough. The performers included Mr. Barnardo Eagle, the 'Great Wizard of the South' presenting magic shows.

In January the following year the company brought a company and the singer Miss E. Land to perform for a limited season. In February, Mr. Fitzgerald the imitator of Mr. Carles Matthews attracted a numerous attendance.

In July 1844 the Sleaford Temperance Annual Tea Festival was held
at the theatre. In the October Harriet Waylett 'the Queen of the English ballad, accompanied by Mr. George Alexander Lee and Mr J. W. Hammond gave a concert to a well attended house.

1845 brought a lecture on 'The physiological effects of alcohol on the body' by R.B. Grindrod, LL.D., and later another magician to the stage, Mr. Jacobs, the great Original Wizard, on 24 January.
In July the property was to be sold by auction at the Bristol Arms inn on 7 August. The lower part is occupied as four tenements, the upper part is still fitted-up and furnished as a theatre, with offices, yard, piggeries etc. The whole is described as 'in an excellent condition'. Performances by the Lancashire bell-ringers met with very poor encouragement in October.

John Hyde is again advertising the theatre to be let in November, 1847.
Mr.Jacobs returned for a spell on 21 December.

The 1849 season opened on 5 November under the direction of Mr. Kinnear, among the company Mesdames Kate Palmer, Doyle, Bland and Melville, Messrs. Pennet, Holsten, Shaw, Watson, Nash, Wolfenden, Miller and Pascal.
In January 1852 a company under Mr Young of Woolwich had a very poor season and left without settling debts.
In February, 1853 the theatre performances are reported well attended, under the management of Miss Faulkland.

The theatre was later taken over by Jane Hill and William Pidd-Fischer in 1853. Mr. Waldron applied for a licence to open the theatre in April. The attendance at the theatre was reported as 'very indifferent during the past week' in May, 1854. In May, the theatre was reopened under the management of Mr. R.A. Douglas for several weeks, the attendance reported as 'miserably small'.
In 1855, despite these attempts to re-open it as a theatre, the building was sold to Thomas Parry who in turn sold the building to the Church of England. Through a variety of donations and grants it was converted into the town's first infant school by local builders Parry and William Kirk, at a cost of £1,085.

Prior to it being restored and re-opened as a theatre in 2000 it had been used as a benefits office and library.

References

External links
Sleaford Playhouse website

Theatres in Lincolnshire
Sleaford
Grade II listed buildings in Lincolnshire
Grade II listed theatres